Alexander Lees may refer to:

Alexander Leese of the Leese Baronets
Alex Lees
Alex Lees (cricketer)

See also
Alexander Lee (disambiguation)